Spearfinger, or U'tlun'ta, is a female monster in Cherokee legend that lived along the eastern side of Tennessee and western part of North Carolina. "U'tlun'ta" translates from Cherokee to "the one with pointed spear”, which refers to the sharp finger on her right hand.   Sometimes, she was called Nûñ'yunu'ï, which means "Stone-dress". This name is from her stone-like skin.

Her sharp finger is said to be her forefinger on her right hand. The sharp finger resembled a spear or obsidian knife, which she used to cut her victims. Her mouth was stained with blood from the livers she ate. Often she clutched her right hand tightly, because her hidden heart and only weak spot was in her right palm.

Spearfinger, being made of stone, sounded like thunder when she walked and crushed rocks into the ground when she stepped on them. Her voice echoed down the mountains to the Cherokee villages and scared the birds of the forest away, which the people saw as a warning sign.

Haunting Tennessee, Spearfinger liked to walk on the trail that joined Chilhowee Mountain and the nearby river. She also walked throughout the mountain range, around streams, and through shadowy Nantahala passes. The Cherokee say her favorite home was Whiteside, a thunder mountain.

Dancing in clouds, she sang her favorite song with her raven friend:

Uwe la na tsiku. Su sa sai.
Liver, I eat it. Su sa sai.
Uwe la na tsiku. Su sa sai.

Powers  
Besides a spear for a finger, she shapeshifts into family members of her child victims. Once she makes herself a part of her victim's world, she lacks the ability to change her form while still in anyone else's sight. Usually, Spearfinger comes in the form of "a harmless old lady".

Since she is made from stone, arrows cannot pierce her skin. They shatter when they hit her. Also, she can pick up boulders effortlessly, stack them, break them, and morph them together.

Her stone structure 
Once, Spearfinger undertook a "great rock bridge through the air from Nûñyû'-tlu`gûñ'yï, the 'Tree rock', on Hiwassee, over to Sanigilâ'gï," which is Whiteside Mountain located on the Blue Ridge. This structure irritated the Higher Beings because it came too close to their Upper World. Higher Beings saw her effort as arrogant "like  man's Bible story of Babel", so they struck it with lightning.

In the nineteenth century, Cherokee pointed out the location where they claim the ruins of Spearfinger's "Tree Rock" remain even today. They named the area along the mountain "Hiawassee" and valley "Nantahala". The site of these remains in Blount County is called "U'Tluntun'yi", which means "The Spearfinger Place".

Her enemy - Stone Man 
Another stone legend on the mountains is called Stone Man. When Stone Man and Spearfinger pass each other, they sense their relation. Cherokee legend says the stone beings know they are enemies because they hunt the same food – livers. Spearfinger acknowledged the other figure is a man because he sings his song about livers in a lower voice that shakes the ground.

Instead of needing to lift stones to build, Stone Man possesses stronger powers than Spearfinger. He simply uses his staff to create bridges to other mountains.

Her hauntings 
In autumn, Cherokee tribes used to burn brush fires, which are best for guiding Spearfinger to the villages. These brush fires would cover entire mountainsides so that the Cherokee could easily hunt the fallen, roasted chestnuts. In other seasons, Spearfinger searched for the clouds of smoke that rose from the valley. Sometimes she caught victims when they wandered for a drink at a stream or picked strawberries near the village.

Her most dangerous attribute was deception. She hid her finger under her robe until she used it. Many times she appeared looking like an old village woman and approached children, who trusted her as one of their older village members. She offered to comb their hair and lulled the child to sleep.

The Cherokee were very cautious about strangers who approached the camp, tried to stay together at all times, and were suspicious of those who wandered off alone. They could come back as the liver-eater in disguise.

There are many tales of her deception, including her trick of turning into her victim, hiding the body, and going into the victim's home to wait until the parents left or the family was asleep to take all their livers. Parents warned children not to go into the forest alone because Spearfinger waited for them and made sure they knew she would appear as "grandmother or [their] favorite aunt".

Hunters alone in the woods used to see an old woman with a strange hand. She would sing her haunting song that frightened them and the hunters ran stealthily back to the village. The Cherokee claim that Spearfinger stabs her victims "in the back of their neck or through their heart, drawing out their livers. Spearfinger's attack is very quick. When she steals livers, her finger does not leave a scar, and victims do not feel the wound. Several days after the unnoticed attack, the victims become ill and die."

Death of Spearfinger 
The Cherokee called a great council, including Tomotley, Tenase, Setico, and Chota towns, which were haunted by the liver eater. The medicine man, adawehis, explained the Spearfinger's deception and how to attract her. They knew about her finger because they saw her dancing on "ledges of Sanigilagi". They just did not know how to kill her, but the medicine man said they might get lucky. Following advice of the medicine man, the people set a trap for Spearfinger by digging a pit and covering it with brush. They made a fire with green saplings, which made a vast amount of smoke rise into the air. Spearfinger saw the smoke from Chilhowee Mountain and ran to the village, crushing the ground as she walked. She approached hiding her right hand with a blanket.

When they saw her as an old woman, the hunter hesitated thinking she was one of their own or from a neighboring village. She called to them for help as she walked, but the medicine man knew her trick. He threw his spear first, which broke into pieces when it hit her. The rest of the hunters began to attack, seeing through her disguise. Her skin deflected the arrows.

Spearfinger revealed her covered hand, ran towards the men, and fell into their pit. She was unharmed, though, by the stakes, and "swatted at the arrows as though they were irksome gnats." When she fell into the pit, she slashed her finger in every direction trying to catch someone and taunted them with her song about eating livers.

Birds flew down from the sky as "celestial beings" to aid the Cherokee. A bird called Utsu'`gï, a titmouse, flew to the hunting party and sang "un, un, un." This sounded like u-nahu, which means "heart", so they aimed for her chest. After the arrows failed to kill her, they caught and cut off the tongue of the titmouse. Ever since then people see its short tongue and know it's a liar. It was not that the bird lied on purpose, but that he "simply was not specific enough." After that, the titmouse flew into the sky, returning to the Upper World. It would never return.

Then, a chickadee, Tsï'kïlilï', finally came and landed on her right hand, the one with the spear, and the hunters viewed that as an omen to shoot for the hand she kept double-fisted.  She became even more upset and scared at this. Hitting her where the wrist and right hand joined or, some say, where the Spearfinger joined the wrist, they severed her heart. She sank to the ground, and her finger "twitched and was still." The curse of Spearfinger, the liver eater, ended.

Stone Man, her other liver-eating friend, heard the victorious cheers and later saw her right hand with the spear on a post beside the village. He considered himself warned. Knowing his own weakness, Stone Man shrugged the warning off because no one knew it yet. He continued to sing his song of war, livers, and hunting.

Since the chickadee's help, the bird is known as the "truth teller" and taken as a sign when perching near a home that the man away will make it home safely.

Despite her death, Cherokee story-tellers continued to tell the legend of Spearfinger and point out the place where her stone structure fell down.

Spearfinger in popular culture
 Spearfinger was the main antagonist of the sixth season of Mountain Monsters.

 The 2021 film "The Hike" has a resurrected spirit form of Spearfinger. She terrorizes hikers and forest rangers in the movie by manipulating nature and taking the form of people she sees on the trail.
 The podcast "Old Gods of Appalachia" makes reference to Spearfinger in Episode 29 "A Friend of the Family".
 In the Jane Yellowrock book series by author Faith Hunter, the main character Jane is from a family of skinwalkers who are in danger of slipping into madness and becoming U'tlun'ta as they get older.

References 

Cherokee legendary creatures
American witchcraft
Female legendary creatures